The Tianjin Derbies (simplified Chinese: 天津德比; pinyin:  Tiānjīn Débǐ) were various local derbies between the football teams of Tianjin. The term specifically refers to individual matches between the teams, but can also be used to describe the general rivalry between the different clubs. There is now only one Tianjin club (Tianjin Jinmen Tiger), so these derbies are effectively defunct.

Clubs 
As of 2023 season, there are one club in the Chinese Super League, China League One and China League Two that play in Tianjin:
 Tianjin Jinmen Tiger F.C. (Super League)
Tianjin Huochetou F.C., established in 1950, is a former professional football club based in Tianjin with the longest history in the city, other former clubs in the highest league include Tianjin Tianhai F.C.(CSL 2017–2019). Tianjin Vanke F.C.(Jia B 1997), Tianjin Lifei F.C.(Jia B 2001), Tianjin Runyulong F.C.(China League One 2011) were formerly in the second-tier league.

Jinmen Tiger-Huochetou Derbies 

Statistics as of 23 October 1994.

Huochetou-Songjiang "Derbies" 

Statistics as of 19 September 2009.

Jinmen Tiger-Tianhai Derbies

Statistics
Statistics as of 28 July 2019.

Top goalscorers
Below is the list of players who have scored goals in official matches (TEDA VS Tianhai only, former players included).

References

China football rivalries
Sport in Tianjin
Tianjin Tianhai F.C.